The House of Somov (Сомовы, Somoff, Somow) is a Russian noble family descended from the Khans of the 14th century.

This family descend from Prince (Murza; Mirza) Oslan - Chelebey, who left the Golden Horde leading an army to support Dmitry Donskoy, Prince of Moscow, during the wars with other principalities and tartarian domination. Oslan accepted to be baptized in 1389 with the name of Prokofiev, married Maria Zotikova Zhitova who was the daughter of Prince Dimitri's Stolnik, Zotik Zhitov. They had five sons: (1) Lev, nicknamed Wide Mouth; (2) Fiodr; (3) Arseny - founder of Arseniev. (Арсеньевы); (4) Jacob Kremenetsky - founder of Kremenetsky and Yanovtsevyh; (5) Paul - founder of Pavlovs.  And Lev Prokofievich, who had two sons: (1) Zechariah, founder of Rtishev and Zhdanovs. (Ртищевы) Ртищевы - сайт однофамильцев (Rtischev Family); and (2)  Andrey, nicknamed "Som" (Catfish) founder of Somov.

Notable members
 Konstantin Somov (1869–1939), Russian painter
 Mikhail Mikhailovich Somov (1908–1973), Soviet oceanographer
 Orest Somov (1793–1833), Russian writer
 Osip Ivanovich Somov (1815–1876), Russian mathematician

Iwaniec Ivanovic Somov is written in the book of the best-thousandth of the nobles and knights (1550). Three Somovs were killed by Polish in the Time of Troubles.

Fyodor Ivanovich Somov
Fyodor Ivanovich Somov was Voevoda in Verhoturie (1619) and his brother Ivan - Voevoda in Kozelsk and Lihvina (1616-1619), son of the last Fedor was a Voevoda in Yelets Sviyazhsk and Ufa (1650-1664). Parfeny Pavlovich Somov was a Voevoda in Vahe (1666)and Lomov (1676), and then clerk of the Russian Council (Думный дворянин). Matvei Petrovich Somov, steward, was a Voevoda in Viazma (1679).

Feodosia Pavlovna Somova
Feodosia Pavlovna Somova (1650?) daughter of Pavel Stepanovich and Maria Verigin (Princess Volkonsky´s daughter) was the mother of Eudoxia Alexeievna Chirikova (¿-1703) wife of the first Count of the Russian Empire, Boris Sheremetev. Feodosia is the ancestor of different nobles and princely Russian families, including: Count Mikhail Borisovich Sheremetev, Princess Sofía Borisovna Urusov (Khanate of Nogai), Countess Ana Borisovna Golovin. Among her descendants are included members of House of Dolgorukov family, Apraxine family (Famille Apraxine), Naryshkin family and others.

Evsievy Leontievich Somov
Evsievy Leontievich Somov, (1692) was the Stolnik of Tsaritsa Natalya Kirillovna Naryshkina second spouse of Tsar Alexei Mikhailovich.

Nadiezhda Petrovna Somova
Nadiezhda Petrovna Somova (1730-?) Princess Dolgorukova, married Prince Ivan Aleksievich Dolgorukov (?-1783) (Долгоруковы) (House of Dolgorukov)

Andrey Andreievich Somov
Andrey Andreievich Somov (?-1815) Major General, hero of the Battle of Eylau. In military service written in 1775, he served in the infantry. In 1790, he received the rank of second major, in 1794 he was promoted to prime the Majors in 1797 - to lieutenant colonel .
October 3, 1798, Colonel Somov was the chief of the Kamchatka Garrison Battalion, 8 June 1799 received the rank of Major General.

January 21, 1803 Somov was appointed chief of the Tula Musketeer Regiment (1806-1807) fought against French Army in Eastern Prussia. At the Battle of Eylau, he commanded a brigade of Polotsk, Tobolsk and Tula musketeer regiments and knocked the French out of the city. April 8, 1807, he was awarded the Order of St. George  the third degree (No. 149 by Chevalier list)
"In the great reward of bravery and courage, rendered in the battle against the French troops of the 26th and 27th of January at Eylau . "

For other differences in this war Somov (December 1, 1807) he was awarded a gold sword with the inscription "For Bravery" . In 1809, Somov retired and died in 1815.

Juliana Fedorovna Somova
Juliana Fedorovna Somova (1815-1856), Princess Galitzina, married Prince Nikolai Borisovich Galitzine (1802-1876).

Afanasy Nikoaievich Somov
Afanasy Nikoaievich Somov (1823-1899) was a Senator and Governor of Tver.

Andrey Ivanovich Somov
Andrey Ivanovich Somov (1830, St. Petersburg - 1909, ibid.), art historian, museum worker and collector. He graduated from Larin's gymnasia in St. Petersburg and the Faculty of Physics and Mathematics of St. Petersburg University (1854). Also attended classes of the Drawing School. He taught physics and mathematics until 1859. That year he published the first accessible description of the art galleries of the Hermitage. In 1872–86, he issued a catalogue of the art gallery of the Academy of Arts. From 1863 to 1886, he managed the office of the St. Petersburg Academy of Sciences. In 1883–89, he taught art history at the Higher Women's Courses (Bestuzhev Courses). From 1883 to 1890, Somov edited the Vestnik Izyaschnykh Iskusstv (Fine Arts Herald) journal. In 1878, he was elected a Fellow of the Society for the Encouragement of the Arts. In 1886, he assumed the post of a chief custodian of the art gallery of the Hermitage; during his tenure, he compiled a scientific catalogue of the gallery (Vol. 1–3, 1889–95) and made a considerable contribution to the evolution of domestic museology and art history. He gathered a notable collection of drawings and china. Somov lived in his own house at 97 Ekaterininsky Canal Embankment (present-day Griboedova Canal Embankment) and was buried at Novodevichye cemetery. His son was an artist, K.A. Somov.

Sergey Mikhailovich Somov
Sergey Mikhailovich Somov (1854-1917?), Chamberlain of the Imperial Court, was the last Marshal of Nobility of Saint Petersburg. Afanasy's Nikolaievich nephew. His son, Sergey Sergeievich Somov and his wife Natalia Vasilievna Naryshkin hid a valuable treasure in Naryshkin-Trubetskoy Palace, before emigrate to France. In April 2012 the treasure was found by workers in a restoring. Members of the Naryshkin and Somov family claim it. Read article: St. Petersburg restorers find pre-Revolution treasure клад продолжение

Eudoxia Mihailovna Somova
Eudoxia Mihailovna Somova (Alexandrovsk-Lugansk 1850 - Nice, France 1924) 1st. Princess Orbeliani (widow of Alexander Orbeliani) 2nd. Princess Murat, married Prince Louis Napoléon Murat, Joachim Murat´s grandson. Eudoxia was the daughter of Cap. Mihail Alexandrovich Somov (Marshal of Nobility) and Princess Maria Pavlovna Chirinsky-Chikhmatov (Crimean Khanate)

Princes Shekhonskie-Somov 

Extinct princely family, originated from Yaroslavl Princes (Principality of Yaroslavl) branch. According to P.N. Petrov research, Somov family descends from Shekhonskie princes, refuting the origins theory related with Prince Oslan - Chelebey.

The family Somov is divided into several branches, is listed in genealogical books Voronezh, Ekaterinoslav, Kazan, Kaluga, Kursk, Moscow, Novgorod, Orel, Saratov, Smolensk, Tambov, Tver, Tula and Kharkov provinces.  The Somov heraldry was included in the Armorial General of the Nobility of the Russian Empire, (chapter IV, 110)
http://gerbovnik.ru/arms/560.html
Coats of arms of Russian noble families - S 
Tver Governorate
Portrait Andrey Ivanovich Somov (1830-1909) Paint. Somov, Konstantin (1897)
Portrait Afanasy Nikolaievich Somov (1823-1899)
Portret Inna Andr. Somov, Baroness v. Sobeck-Skal u. Kornitz. Paint. Zdrazila, Adolf (1920) Opava
Sergey Sergeievich Somov (fourth p. left to right)

References

External links
Armorial General of the Nobility of the Russian Empire
Heraldry Materials and Research (russian)
Сомовы
Сергей Михайлович Сомов
Сомов, Андрей Андреевич
Сомов, Николай Николаевич
Princes Shehonskie-Somov
Princes Shekhonskie

Russian-language surnames